The vice president of Zanzibar (Swahili: Makamu wa Rais wa Zanzibar) is a political position in Zanzibar. The vice presidency was created by the 2010 amendments made to the Zanzibar Constitution. First Vice President is supposed to come from a political party other than that of the President of Zanzibar. According to the Constitution, the Second Vice President is supposed to be a member of the Zanzibar House of Representatives, and must come from the same political party as the President.

The vice presidency could be considered only ceremonial.

Vice presidents of Zanzibar

First Vice President

Second Vice President

See also

 Zanzibar
 Politics of Zanzibar
 President of Zanzibar
 Lists of office-holders

References

External links
 Website of the second vice president

2010 establishments in Tanzania
Politics of Zanzibar
Government of Zanzibar
 
Zanzibar